Aaron DeShon McGhee (born June 28, 1979) is an American former professional basketball player.

And now coach/owner of team United Texas.

College career 

McGhee started his career at Cincinnati, where he played the 1998-99 season and averaged 2.8 points and 1.9 rebounds in 30 games. He left Cincinnati to become a first-team National Junior College Athletic Association All-American in 1999-00 at Vincennes (Ind.) University where he averaged 26.5 points, 9.0 rebounds, 1.8 assists and 1.6 blocked shots per contest. Was named MVP of the 2000 NJCAA national tournament when he averaged 34.5 points per game as Vincennes went 32-5 and placed fifth in the national tournament. Set a Vincennes single-season scoring record (874 points).

McGhee transferred to the University of Oklahoma, where he averaged 16 ppg and 7.7 rpg in his senior year at Oklahoma. He was noted for being one of the top reasons why OU reached the final four in that year. In five NCAA tournament games, he averaged 21.8 points and 7.2 rebounds. He had 26 points and 12 rebounds in their first round win against Illinois-Chicago, then followed it up with 25, 21 and 15 points against Xavier, Arizona and Missouri respectively. He had 22 points and 8 boards in a losing effort in the National Semis against Indiana. Overall in his senior year, he had a total of 13 doubles doubles, only second behind forward Drew Gooden. He ranked 6th in the big 12 in scoring and 5th in rebounding.

McGhee averaged 11 points and 5 rebounds a game for his college career. He was left undrafted at the 2002 NBA draft despite being the MVP in Portsmouth pre-draft camp.

Professional career
In September 2014, McGhee signed with Sigal Prishtina, but in November 2014, he left the club. Later that month he moved to South Korea and signed with Anyang KGC. In March 2015, he signed with Vaqueros de Bayamón of the Puerto Rican Baloncesto Superior Nacional.

References

External links 
 NBA.com Profile
 Eurobasket.com Profile
 FIBA.com Profile

1979 births
Living people
American expatriate basketball people in China
American expatriate basketball people in Israel
American expatriate basketball people in Italy
American expatriate basketball people in Kosovo
American expatriate basketball people in Mexico
American expatriate basketball people in the Philippines
American expatriate basketball people in Russia
American expatriate basketball people in South Korea
American expatriate basketball people in Spain
American expatriate basketball people in Ukraine
American men's basketball players
Anyang KGC players
Basketball players from Illinois
BC Donetsk players
BC Khimik players
BC Ural Yekaterinburg players
Suwon KT Sonicboom players
Cangrejeros de Santurce basketball players
Cantabria Baloncesto players
CB Granada players
Cincinnati Bearcats men's basketball players
Ironi Nahariya players
Israeli Basketball Premier League players
Jefes de Fuerza Lagunera players
KB Prishtina players
Maccabi Rishon LeZion basketball players
Maccabi Tel Aviv B.C. players
Maratonistas de Coamo players
Oklahoma Sooners men's basketball players
Philippine Basketball Association imports
Power forwards (basketball)
Sportspeople from Aurora, Illinois
TNT Tropang Giga players
Victoria Libertas Pallacanestro players
Vincennes Trailblazers men's basketball players
Xinjiang Flying Tigers players
United States men's national basketball team players